There have been two baronetcies created for persons with the surname Horsfall, one in the Baronetage of Ireland and one in the Baronetage of the United Kingdom.

The Horsfall Baronetcy, of Kilkenny, was created in the Baronetage of Ireland in 1642 for Ciprian Horsfall.

The Horsfall Baronetcy, of Hayfield in the Parish of Kildwick in the West Riding of the County of York, is a title in the Baronetage of the United Kingdom. It was created on 27 November 1909 for John Horsfall. He was a worsted spinner and banker and also served as Chairman of the West Riding of Yorkshire County Council.

Horsfall baronets, of Kilkenny (1642)
Sir Ciprian Horsfall, Baronet (died )

Horsfall baronets, of Hayfield (1909)
Sir John Cousin Horsfall, 1st Baronet (1846–1920)
Sir (John) Donald Horsfall, 2nd Baronet (1891–1975)
Sir John Musgrave Horsfall, MC, JP, 3rd Baronet (1915–2005)
Sir Edward John Wright Horsfall, 4th Baronet (born 1940)

Notes

References 
Kidd, Charles, Williamson, David (editors). Debrett's Peerage and Baronetage (1990 edition). New York: St Martin's Press, 1990, 

Horsfall
Extinct baronetcies in the Baronetage of Ireland